Greentech Media, a subsidiary of Wood Mackenzie, was a media company based in Massachusetts, United States, that generated daily reports, market research studies, and news on electricity systems and green technology and green jobs.

It was founded in February 2007 by Scott Clavenna and Rick Thompson, and announced that it had raised $1 million in Series-A venture capital funding the following May. It announced another $2.75 million Series-B round in May 2008. The company had four offices, in Boston, New York, San Francisco and Munich. In February 2021, Wood Mackenzie announced the closure of the Greentech Media website by March 2021, while podcasts would continue; however, podcasts have since been terminated. Soon after, several Greentech Media journalists and staff members launched Canary Media, an independent affiliate of RMI.

Deal summary 
Greentech Media Inc. has released quarterly data showing that venture capital investment in green technologies totaled US$1.2 billion in 85 deals in the second quarter of 2009. This is up from $836 million in 59 deals in the first quarter of 2009.

Podcasts 
Greentech Media produced three podcasts: "Energy Gang", a weekly digest of energy topics, hosted by Stephen Lacey, Katherine Hamilton, and Jigar Shah, "The Interchange," a more technical energy podcast featuring industry insights, hosted by Stephen Lacey and Shayle Kann, and "Political Climate," hosted by Julia Pyper, Shane Skelton, and Brandon Hurlbut.

See also 
 Smart grid

References

External links
Greentech Media
Hectamedia 

Companies based in Massachusetts
Mass media companies of the United States